Perrie Voss is a Canadian actress, most noted as a co-creator and co-star of the web series Avocado Toast.

Born and raised in Toronto, Ontario, Voss first met her collaborator Heidi Lynch in 2015 when they acted together in a production of Peter Colley's play The Ghost Island Light. Lynch had recently come out as bisexual, while Voss was going through the recent announcement that her parents were divorcing, which ultimately formed the initial storyline for Avocado Toast.

She has also appeared in the film Adult Adoption, and has had guest roles in the television series Cold Blood, Taken, The Handmaid's Tale, The Boys, Murdoch Mysteries and Strays.

She is a two-time Canadian Screen Award nominee for Best Lead Performance in a Web Program or Series for Avocado Toast, receiving nods at the 9th Canadian Screen Awards in 2021 and at the 11th Canadian Screen Awards in 2023.

References

External links

21st-century Canadian actresses
Canadian film actresses
Canadian stage actresses
Canadian television actresses
Canadian web series actresses
Actresses from Toronto
Living people